Laudium Oval is a cricket ground in Laudium, Gauteng, South Africa.  The ground was used during the 2005 Women's Cricket World Cup, hosting five group-stage matches.  It has also hosted two other women's One Day Internationals.

References

Cricket grounds in South Africa
Sports venues in Gauteng
City of Tshwane Metropolitan Municipality